Now That's What I Call Music! 50 is the 50th edition of the Now! series in the United States, released on May 6, 2014. The album features 21 tracks including the Billboard Hot 100 number-one hits, "Happy", "Dark Horse" and "All of Me".

A special deluxe edition includes 14 additional tracks from previously released volumes of the series as selected through an online voting process.

The album sold 153,000 copies and debuted at No. 1 on the Billboard 200 albums chart. The album is the 18th album in the series to reach the top of chart, and, as of 2022, the most recent in the US series to do so. The Beatles are the only artist to amass more number ones (19) than the Now series. As of October 2014, the compilation has sold 642,000 copies. In 2019, the album reached number 135 on the Billboard 200's Decade-End chart.

Track listing

Deluxe Edition (Disc 2)

Charts

Weekly charts

Year-end charts

Decade-end charts

References

External links

2014 compilation albums
 050
Universal Music Enterprises compilation albums